Greene County Regional Airport  is a county-owned public-use airport located three nautical miles (6 km) northeast of the central business district of Greensboro, a city in Greene County, Georgia, United States. As per the FAA's National Plan of Integrated Airport Systems for 2009-2013, it is classified as a general aviation airport.

Facilities and aircraft 
It has one runway designated 7/25 with a 5,004 by 75 ft (1,525 x 23 m) asphalt surface.

For the 12-month period ending August 2, 2007, the airport had 9,950 aircraft operations, an average of 27 per day:
95% general aviation and 5% military. At that time there were 25 aircraft based at this airport: 64% single-engine, 20% multi-engine and 16% jet.

References

External links 
 Greene County Regional Airport page at Georgia DOT Aviation web site
 
 

Airports in Georgia (U.S. state)
Buildings and structures in Greene County, Georgia
Transportation in Greene County, Georgia